Renato Miracco (born 1953) is a scholar, art critic, and curator from Naples, Italy. Formerly the Cultural Attaché of the Italian Embassy in Washington, he is presently the member of the Board of Guarantors for the Italian Academy at Columbia University. He has curated numerous important exhibitions on Italian art worldwide and has published widely. Miracco was awarded the Order of Merit of the Italian Republic for Cultural Achievements in 2018 and received a Green Card for Exceptional Ability, from President Obama.

Career highlights 
Miracco served as the Cultural Attaché of the Italian Embassy from 2010 to 2018. In 2013, he organized a series of more than 300 events to celebrate and explore the impact of Italian culture in the United States. As Attaché, Miracco supervised all of the Italian Embassy's exhibitions, organized the Italy@150 program in partnership with over 80 museums across the United States, and helped organize a Memorandum of Understanding on Archaeology between the governments of Italy and the United States.

Miracco's previous roles have included Director of Chiara Fama for Cultural Affairs for the Italian Cultural Institute in New York from 2007–09, Advisor to the Ministry of Foreign Affairs of Italy, and Advisor for the Venice Biennale.

Miracco has lectured at Pratt Institute and other universities and institutions across the globe and has curated exhibitions at prestigious museums and collections including the Metropolitan Museum of Art, The Phillips Collection, the National Gallery of Art, the Morgan Library and Museum, Centre Pompidou, the Estorick Collection, and the Tate Modern.

Exhibitions

Publications

References 

Italian art critics
Italian scholars
Italian art curators
1953 births
Living people
Cultural attachés